Poker Face is an American crime drama television series created by Rian Johnson for the streaming service Peacock. Stylized as a "case-of-the-week" murder mystery series, it stars Natasha Lyonne as Charlie Cale, a casino worker on the run who entangles herself into several mysterious deaths of strangers along the way.

Peacock announced the series in March 2021, with Lyonne attached and Johnson as director. Nora Zuckerman and Lilla Zuckerman were named as co-showrunners. Poker Face consists of 10 episodes and debuted on January 26, 2023. The series has received critical acclaim. In February 2023, the series was renewed for a second season.

Premise
Poker Face is a murder mystery series stylized as a character-driven, case-of-the-week mystery, with each episode adapting the inverted detective story format popularized by Columbo.

The series centers around Charlie Cale, a casino worker with an innate ability to detect lies, traveling across the United States on the run from a casino boss following a suspicious death. Along the way, she encounters colorful characters and solves homicides in a variety of settings.

Cast and characters

Main
 Natasha Lyonne as Charlie Cale, a casino worker who goes on the run

Recurring

 Benjamin Bratt as Cliff LeGrand, the casino head of security, who chases Charlie across the country

Guest

Episodes

Production

Development
The project was announced in March 2021, with Rian Johnson serving as creator, writer, director and executive producer. Johnson stated that the series would delve into "the type of fun, character driven, case-of-the-week mystery goodness I grew up watching." The series was inspired by Columbo, being referred as a "howcatchem". Johnson also used Magnum, P.I., The Rockford Files, Quantum Leap, Highway to Heaven and The Incredible Hulk as influences for the tone of the series. Johnson was interested in "doing that Columbo or even Quantum Leap thing of having every episode be an anthropological deep dive into a little corner of America that you might not otherwise see." On February 15, 2023, Peacock renewed the series for a second season.

Casting
The announcement of the series included that Natasha Lyonne would serve as the main lead actress. She was approached by Johnson about working on a procedural project together, with Lyonne as the lead character. As Johnson explained, the role was "completely cut to measure for her." While the series and lead character would share things in common with Columbo, the writers sought to differentiate the lead character by having her work outside of the law.

Due to the series' procedural aspects, the episodes feature several guest stars. Johnson was inspired by the number of actors who guest starred on Columbo, wanting to deem each guest star as the star of the episode, which allowed them to attract many actors.

In April 2022, Benjamin Bratt joined the series. Instead of a guest role, his character would recur as Cliff, the head of security at a casino where Charlie works. When she escapes the casino, his character would go after her, which Bratt called “a ticking clock for the show".

Filming
According to the director of the Hudson Valley Film Commission, filming was based in Newburgh, New York, and ran from April through October 2022, in locations throughout the mid-Hudson Valley. At least one episode of the series was filmed in late August 2022 in Albuquerque, New Mexico. Outdoor scenes were filmed in Laughlin, Nevada, in September 2022, with the Riverside Resort Hotel & Casino depicting the fictional Frost Casino.

Release
Poker Face premiered on January 26, 2023, with the first four episodes available immediately and the rest debuting on a weekly basis.

International sales for the series are handled by Paramount Global Content Distribution. The series is available on Citytv+ and Citytv in Canada and on Stan in Australia.

Reception
Poker Face was met with critical acclaim upon release. The review aggregator website Rotten Tomatoes reported a 99% approval rating with an average rating of 8.5/10, based on 88 critic reviews. The website's critics consensus reads, "With the incomparable Natasha Lyonne as an ace up its sleeve, Poker Face is a puzzle box of modest ambitions working with a full deck." Metacritic, which uses a weighted average, assigned a score of 84 out of 100 based on 40 critics, indicating "universal acclaim".

Chicago Sun-Timess Richard Roeper gave a rating of 3.5 out of 4 stars and said, "The beauty part is watching the amazing Natasha Lyonne's Charlie puzzle out the crime in clever and often hilarious fashion." Linda Holmes of NPR felt Lyonne's "unforgettable" performance proved herself to be the "Peter Falk of her generation". Ben Travers of IndieWire gave the series a B and stated "All this star power is enough to guarantee Poker Face will be, at least, an enjoyable diversion. But... it's hard to shake the feeling that Poker Face isn't as good as it could've been." The Atlantics Sophie Gilbert believed the show succeeded in its first episodes "by attending to the emotional cadences of overlooked people and places" but criticized the characters of later episodes for falling into tropes.

References

External links
 
 

2020s American comedy-drama television series
2020s American mystery television series
2023 American television series debuts
American detective television series
English-language television shows
Nonlinear narrative television series
Peacock (streaming service) original programming
Television series by Media Rights Capital
Television shows about murder
Television shows filmed in Nevada
Television shows filmed in New Mexico
Television shows filmed in New York (state)